Hair keratin is a type of keratin found in hair and nails. There are two types of hair keratin:

 the acidic type I hair keratin 
type I hair keratin 1, 
type I hair keratin 2, 
type I hair keratin 3A, 
type I hair keratin 3B, 
type I hair keratin 4, 
type I hair keratin 5, 
type I hair keratin 6, 
type I hair keratin 7, 
type I hair keratin 8, 
 the basic type II hair keratin
type II hair keratin 1, 
type II hair keratin 2, 
type II hair keratin 3, 
type II hair keratin 4, 
type II hair keratin 5, 
type II hair keratin 6,

External links
 
 

Keratins